Lippmaa is a surname of Estonian origin. Notable people with the surname include:

Endel Lippmaa (1930–2015), Estonian physicist and politician
Jaan Lippmaa (1942–2021), Estonian engineer and politician
Teodor Lippmaa (1892–1943), Estonian botanist

Estonian-language surnames